The Agrarian Union "Aleksandar Stamboliyski" (Zemedelski Sayuz "Aleksandar Stamboliyski", ZS-AS), is a agrarian political party in Bulgaria.

It was founded in 1993 by members of the Bulgarian Agrarian People's Union. Until 2005 it was known as the Bulgarian Agrarian People's Union "Aleksandar Stamboliyski" (Balgarski Zemedelski Naroden Sayuz "Aleksandar Stamboliyski", BZNS-AS). Since 2001 it is part of the Coalition for Bulgaria, an alliance led by the Bulgarian Socialist Party.

At the Bulgarian parliamentary election in 2009, the Coalition for Bulgaria received 17.7% of the popular vote and 40 out of 240 seats. The party had only 1 seat for its leader Panchev.

During the 2017 Bulgarian parliamentary election the ZS-AS ran on the electoral-list of Coalition for Bulgaria, where it won 1 seat of a total of 80, that the coalition won. In 2019 due to squabbles with BSP, ZS-AS left the alliance and its one single MP move to the group of the Independent MPs in parliament, still representing the ZS-AS.

External links
Official website

1993 establishments in Bulgaria
Agrarian parties in Bulgaria
Political parties established in 1993